The Nathan A. Woodworth House is a historic house at 28 Channing Street in New London, Connecticut.  Built in 1890, it is a high quality example of transitional Queen Anne and Shingle style architecture.  It was listed on the National Register of Historic Places on June 1, 1982, and is part of the Post Hill Historic District.

Description and history
The Nathan A. Woodworth House is located in a residential area west of downtown New London, overlooking Williams Park on the west side of Channing Street at Granite Street.  It is a -story wood-frame structure, with asymmetrical massing and a busy roof line characteristic of the Queen Anne style. It has a number of different types of projections and roof gables, decorative chimney caps, and a front porch with turned posts and balustrade.  The interior features finely crafted woodwork, fireplaces with decorative tile surrounds, and a main staircase newel post with an integrated gas light fixture.

The house was built in 1890 for Nathan Woodworth, who was in the paper milling business in nearby Waterford; its design appears to be an adaptation from an architectural pattern book.  The land on which it was built was purchased by Woodworth's father in 1865, and sold to his (Nathan's) wife in 1890.  Construction of this house contributed to the reputation of the Williams Park area as a desirable upper-class residential enclave.  Its builders, the Bishop Brothers, were one of the best-known construction firms in the city at the time.

See also
National Register of Historic Places listings in New London County, Connecticut

References

Houses on the National Register of Historic Places in Connecticut
Queen Anne architecture in Connecticut
Houses completed in 1890
Houses in New London, Connecticut
National Register of Historic Places in New London County, Connecticut
Historic district contributing properties in Connecticut